The following television stations broadcast on digital channel 5 in the United States:

 K05AF-D in Mina/Luning, Nevada, on virtual channel 8, which rebroadcasts KOLO-TV
 K05AH-D in Hot Springs, Montana, on virtual channel 13, which rebroadcasts KECI-TV
 K05AR-D in Rockville, Utah, on virtual channel 5, which rebroadcasts KSL-TV
 K05BE-D in Lehmi, etc., Idaho, on virtual channel 8, which rebroadcasts KPAX-TV
 K05BU-D in Enterprise, Utah, on virtual channel 4, which rebroadcasts KTVX
 K05CF-D in Weaverville, California, on virtual channel 7, which rebroadcasts KRCR-TV
 K05CR-D in Hayfork, California, on virtual channel 9, which rebroadcasts KIXE-TV
 K05DQ-D in Burney, etc., California, on virtual channel 7, which rebroadcasts KRCR-TV
 K05EM-D in Paradise, California
 K05EY-D in Terrace Lakes, Idaho, on virtual channel 2, which rebroadcasts KBOI-TV
 K05FC-D in Lake McDonald, Montana, on virtual channel 9, which rebroadcasts KCFW-TV
 K05FW-D in Girdwood, Alaska, on virtual channel 7, which rebroadcasts KAKM
 K05GA-D in Dolores, Colorado, on virtual channel 5
 K05GJ-D in Thayne, etc., Wyoming, on virtual channel 3, which rebroadcasts KIDK
 K05GL-D in Coolin, Idaho, on virtual channel 7, which rebroadcasts KSPS-TV
 K05GM-D in Plains-Paradise, Montana, on virtual channel 8, which rebroadcasts KPAX-TV
 K05GQ-D in Kooskia, Idaho, on virtual channel 12, which rebroadcasts KUID-TV
 K05IZ-D in Hinsdale, Montana, on virtual channel 18, which rebroadcasts K18BN-D
 K05JU-D in Elko, Nevada, on virtual channel 14, which rebroadcasts KJZZ-TV
 K05JW-D in Ismay Canyon, Colorado, on virtual channel 5
 K05KK-D in Poplar, Montana, on virtual channel 5, which rebroadcasts KXGN-TV
 K05LI-D in Weber Canyon, Colorado, on virtual channel 17, which rebroadcasts K17JJ-D
 K05ML-D in Sula, Montana, on virtual channel 13, which rebroadcasts KECI-TV
 K05MN-D in Logan, Utah, on virtual channel 38
 K05MR-D in Bullhead City, Arizona, on virtual channel 5, which rebroadcasts KPHO-TV
 K05MU-D in Leavenworth, Washington, on virtual channel 4, which rebroadcasts KXLY-TV
 K05MW-D in Ferndale, Montana, on virtual channel 34, which rebroadcasts KMJD-LD
 K05MX-D in Nephi, Utah
 K05ND-D in Long Valley Junction, Utah, on virtual channel 8, which rebroadcasts KTTA-LD
 K05NE-D in Polson, Montana, on virtual channel 28, which rebroadcasts KAYU-TV
 K05NF-D in Salina, Utah, on virtual channel 30, which rebroadcasts KUCW
 K05NG-D in Cedar Canyon, Utah, on virtual channel 2, which rebroadcasts KUTV
 K05NL-D in Reno, Nevada
 KAMK-LD in Eugene, Oregon, on virtual channel 36, which rebroadcasts KTVC
 KCWX in Fredericksburg, Texas, on virtual channel 2, which will move to channel 8
 KHSD-TV in Lead, South Dakota, on virtual channel 11
 KNHL in Hastings, Nebraska, on virtual channel 5
 KOBI in Medford, Oregon, on virtual channel 5
 KPFW-LD in Dallas, Texas, on virtual channel 18
 KQRY-LD in Fort Smith, Arkansas, on virtual channel 36, which rebroadcasts KFFS-CD
 KRCB in Cotati, California, on virtual channel 22
 KRDH-LD in Cripple Creek, etc., Colorado, on virtual channel 5
 KSCP-LP in Sitka, Alaska, on virtual channel 5, which rebroadcasts KUBD
 KTDJ-LD in Dayton, Texas, on virtual channel 5
 KVCR-DT in San Bernardino, California, on virtual channel 24
 KVHF-LD in Fresno, California, on virtual channel 4
 KXDA-LD in Garland, Texas, on virtual channel 41
 KXGN-TV in Glendive, Montana, on virtual channel 5
 KXLF-TV in Butte, Montana, on virtual channel 4
 W05AA-D in Roanoke, Virginia, on virtual channel 13, which rebroadcasts WSET-TV
 W05AR-D in Bryson City, etc., North Carolina, on virtual channel 4, which rebroadcasts WYFF
 W05AW-D in Christiansted, U.S. Virgin Islands, on virtual channel 12, which rebroadcasts WTJX-TV
 W05BV-D in Starkville, Mississippi, on virtual channel 5
 W05CO-D in Sarasota, Florida
 W05CY-D in Mayaguez, Puerto Rico, on virtual channel 5
 W05DA-D in Fajardo, Puerto Rico, on virtual channel 5, which rebroadcasts WORA-TV
 W05DB-D in Ponce, Puerto Rico, on virtual channel 5, which rebroadcasts WORA-TV
 W05DD-D in St. Francis, Maine, on virtual channel 10, which rebroadcasts WMEM-TV
 WBKP in Calumet, Michigan, on virtual channel 5
 WCYB-TV in Bristol, Virginia, on virtual channel 5, which will move to channel 35
 WDGT-LD in Miami, Florida, on virtual channel 24
 WDTO-LD in Orlando, Florida, on virtual channel 5
 WEWF-LD in Jupiter, Florida
 WEXZ-LD in Bangor, Maine, on virtual channel 13
 WFIG-LD in Charlotte Amalie, U.S. Virgin Islands, on virtual channel 8, which rebroadcasts WSVI
 WFXZ-CD in Boston, Massachusetts, which shares WGBH-TV's spectrum, on virtual channel 24
 WGBH-TV in Boston, Massachusetts, on virtual channel 2
 WGVK in Kalamazoo, Michigan, on virtual channel 52
 WIVN-LD in Newcomerstown, Ohio, on virtual channel 29, which rebroadcasts WIVM-LD
 WIWN in Fond du Lac, Wisconsin, on virtual channel 68
 WJSP-TV in Columbus, Georgia, on virtual channel 28
 WLMB in Toledo, Ohio, on virtual channel 40, which will move to channel 35
 WMBE-LD in Myrtle Beach, South Carolina
 WMC-TV in Memphis, Tennessee, on virtual channel 5
 WMDE in Dover, Delaware, on virtual channel 36
 WNYB in Jamestown, New York, on virtual channel 26
 WNYX-LD in New York, New York, on virtual channel 32, which rebroadcasts WNXY-LD
 WOI-DT in Ames, Iowa, on virtual channel 5
 WRUF-LD in Gainesville, Florida, on virtual channel 10
 WTNB-CD in Cleveland, Tennessee, on virtual channel 27
 WTVF (DRT) in Nashville, Tennessee, on virtual channel 5
 WXNJ-LD in West Orange, New Jersey, on virtual channel 22

The following stations, which are no longer licensed, formerly broadcast on digital channel 5:
 K05ET-D in Likely, California
 K05FR-D in Crowley Lake, California
 K05MC-D in Billings, Montana
 K05MI-D in Lakeport, California
 K05MY-D in Bakersfield, California
 KCEM-LD in Chelan Butte, Washington
 KIDA in Sun Valley, Idaho, on virtual channel 5
 KRCW-LP in Portland, Oregon
 W05CS-D in Port Jervis, New York
 WBDI-LD in Springfield, Illinois

References

05 digital